The black-capped woodland warbler (Phylloscopus herberti) is a leaf warbler species in the family Phylloscopidae; it was formerly placed in the "Old World warbler" assemblage.

It is found in the Cameroon line (including Bioko). Its natural habitat is subtropical or tropical moist montane forests.

References

black-capped woodland warbler
Birds of the Gulf of Guinea
Birds of Central Africa
black-capped woodland warbler
Taxonomy articles created by Polbot